Joseph Roamon Fautsch (February 28, 1887 – March 16, 1971) was a pinch hitter in Major League Baseball. He played for the Chicago White Sox in 1916.

References

External links

1887 births
1971 deaths
Chicago White Sox players
Red Wing Manufacturers players
Winona Pirates players
Baseball players from Minneapolis